The Tatra T 810 (Tactic) is a medium truck made by Czech company Tatra; it replaced the popular Praga V3S which was introduced in the 1950s and served in the Army of the Czech Republic until 2008. Unlike other Tatra trucks, it does not use classic Tatra air-cooled engine and the traditional Tatra conception of backbone chassis and swinging half-axles, but the customary truck architecture with conventional frame. It is mainly intended for difficult terrain conditions. The civilian version T 810-C was introduced in 2010.

History
In early 1990s the Czech Army was aiming to replace its aging fleet of medium trucks, which was represented by the Praga V3S model introduced into production as early as in 1953. The selection procedure was won the Roudnické slévárny a strojírny (Foundries And Machine-Works of Roudnice) with  its ROSS R210 project. The R210 was outsourcing many components from Renault. Since 1996 the company delivered 15 vehicles for the testing purposes, after which the delivery of serial vehicles was supposed to start, however in 1998 the Czech Army canceled the contract. The company has invested a lot into the development of the truck and subsequently it bankrupted. 

In 2002 the Tatra company bought the documentation and rights to the R210 truck in order to enter the market of medium trucks (from 3,5 tons to 12 tons), as all the models the company offered were in the class of heavy trucks. It intended to modernize the original project, and it also hoped that the Czech Army will finally undertake the replacement of its fleet of 4000 Praga V3s (while Tatra was supplying the Army with heavy trucks since World War I). Tatra created alliance with other companies to work on the project together; for example the Praga was supposed to deliver gear boxes and portal axle. Other components were to be delivered by Renault (engine, cab).

In 2005 the Czech government approved acquisition of the T810 trucks in August 2005, while deliveries were scheduled to start in April 2008. 

The civilian version T 810-C was introduced in 2010, with Tatra claiming it is the only truck with maximum weight of 15,5 tons that has three driven axles, which together with its portal architecture is supposed to give it advantage over the competition in terrain.

In 2017, Tatra 810 4×4 has created the world record, the vehicle crossed the highest artificially created obstacle by the truck, artificial barrier called Brut Monster is one of the most extreme artificial barriers of its kind. Tatra has managed to climb and descent 146%, respectively to surpass inclination of 55°, of 7.5-meter-high obstacle.

Operators
  Army of the Czech Republic
  Armed Forces of Saudi Arabia
  Armed Forces of UAE
 Civilian users (T 810-C)

References

T810
Cars of the Czech Republic
Military trucks
All-wheel-drive vehicles
Trucks of the Czech Republic
Vehicles introduced in 2008